Bordon 3-y (Ühüs Bordoŋ) is a rural locality (a selo), one of two settlements, in addition to Elgyay, the administrative centre of the Rural Okrug, in Elgyaysky Rural Okrug of Suntarsky District in the Sakha Republic, Russia. Its population as of the 2002 Census was 4.

References

Notes

Sources
Official website of the Sakha Republic. Registry of the Administrative-Territorial Divisions of the Sakha Republic. Suntarsky District. 

Rural localities in Suntarsky District